Manuel Martić (born 15 August 1995) is an Austrian professional footballer who plays as a midfielder for Veikkausliiga club HJK.

Club career
On 11 January 2022, Martić signed with HJK in Finland.

References

External links
 

1995 births
Living people
People from Steyr
Austrian footballers
Association football midfielders
SK Rapid Wien players
SKN St. Pölten players
SK Vorwärts Steyr players
NK Inter Zaprešić players
Mezőkövesdi SE footballers
Helsingin Jalkapalloklubi players
Austrian Football Bundesliga players
Croatian Football League players
Nemzeti Bajnokság I players
Austrian expatriate footballers
Austrian expatriate sportspeople in Hungary
Expatriate footballers in Hungary
Austrian expatriate sportspeople in Finland
Expatriate footballers in Finland
Footballers from Upper Austria